Rorion Gracie (born January 10, 1952) is a Brazilian-born Gracie Jiu-Jitsu Grand Master, a prominent member of the Gracie family, writer, publisher, producer, lecturer, lawyer and the co-founder of the Ultimate Fighting Championship. He is the oldest son of Hélio Gracie and one of the few people in the world to hold a 9th degree red belt in Brazilian Jiu-Jitsu, and is widely recognized as one of the men responsible for introducing Gracie/Brazilian Jiu-jitsu to the United States and the world following the arrival in the US of first cousin, Carley Gracie in 1972.

Early life and education
Rorion started Jiu-Jitsu at a young age, doing demonstrations and classes. He spent his youth learning how to teach under the tutelage of his father, Grand Master Hélio Gracie. In December 1969, he travelled to the United States for a vacation returning to Brazil in the end of 1970. He attended the Federal University of Rio de Janeiro, graduating with a degree in Law.

Career
In 1978, Rorion Gracie  moved to Southern California where he worked as an extra in movies and television. Attempting to spread Jiu-Jitsu culture, he laid some mats in his garage in Hermosa Beach and invited people he met to try the sport. In 1985, Rorion invited his 18-year-old brother, Royce, to move to America.

Rorion was a technical adviser for the 1987 movie Lethal Weapon providing training to actors Mel Gibson and Gary Busey. The director Richard Donner wanted Gibson's character to have a unique style of fighting never seen onscreen before with the second assistant director Willie Simmons, who was interested in unusual forms of martial arts, choosing BJJ and two other martial arts styles to use in the movie.

In 1988, Rorion produced the documentary Gracie Jiu-Jitsu In Action.  In 1989, Rorion with brothers Royce, Rickson and Royler, opened the first Gracie Jiu-Jitsu Academy in Torrance, California. In 1991, he produced The Basics of Gracie Jiu-Jitsu, a five volume training video series together with a special edition volume.

Rorion was also a technical advisor, a fight scene choreographer for Lethal Weapon 3 in 1992, providing training to Rene Russo together with martial artist Cheryl Wheeler-Dixon and a Karate instructor. The Karate instructor immediately went on to rehearse spectacular ura-mawashi high kicks, which resulted in Russo pulled groin muscles the very first day, and was so frustrated with learning the technique, that Richard Donner asked Gracie not only to teach her, but also to attend the film set for filming sequence as a technical advisor. Gracie was so proficient and pliable in an uke role, that Russo refused to do the throw with whoever else excluding Gracie, and insisted him to step into the action as a stuntman for a fight scene.

In 1993, inspired by countless exhibition matches termed the "Gracie Challenge", a tradition that started with his uncle and Gracie jiu-jitsu co-founder Carlos Gracie, Rorion teamed with promoter and business executive Art Davie in the creation of the Ultimate Fighting Championship (UFC). Davie had always dreamed of an inter-discipline contest, pitting various martial arts against one another to determine the most effective. Rorion was only interested in showcasing his father's style, and demonstrating its dominance. Through this pay-per-view spectacle, he hoped to show that, in a "no time limit - no rules" setting, Gracie jiu-jitsu was the only system of self-defense that would give someone a realistic chance of defeating a larger, more athletic adversary. Davie recruited seven martial artists of different styles to participate in a single-elimination tournament. Rorion enlisted his brother Royce to represent the family style in the competition. Due to his smaller frame and relatively low body weight, Royce was the smallest competitor, making an excellent example of the powers of Gracie Jiu-Jitsu.

In 1994, following UFC, a small group of high-ranking military personnel, from the most elite unit in the US Army Special Operations Forces, contacted Rorion and asked him to develop an objective hand-to-hand combat course based on the most effective techniques of Gracie Jiu-Jitsu. The result was the Gracie Combatives military course that was taught to US Special Operations Forces, conventional US military units and the CIA. In January 2002, the techniques were the foundation of the official US Army Modern Army Combatives Program (MACP). The Gracie Resisting Attack Procedures for Law Enforcement (GRAPLE) was also concurrently developed with the combatives course, following a similar request from law enforcement for a defensive tactics training course, that was adopted by virtually all US law enforcement. The two courses were later merged to create the Gracie Survival Tactics (GST), a combative and defensive tactics course, for both military and law enforcement.

Books
Rorion wrote and published the book The Gracie Diet in 2010.

Videos

Awards and honors
Black Belt Magazine named Rorion Gracie the 2006 Instructor of the Year.

Instructor lineage
Kano Jigoro → Tomita Tsunejiro → Mitsuyo "Count Koma" Maeda → Carlos Gracie → Helio Gracie → Rorion Gracie

See also 
List of Brazilian Jiu-Jitsu practitioners
Gracie family

References

External links
Official YouTube Channel
Gracie Jiu-Jitsu Academy

Gracie Jiu-Jitsu Academy at YouTube

1952 births
Sportspeople from Rio de Janeiro (city)
Sportspeople from Torrance, California
Brazilian emigrants to the United States
Living people
Rorion
People awarded a red belt in Brazilian jiu-jitsu